The Cemetery H culture was a Bronze Age culture in the Punjab region in the northern part of the Pakistan, from about 1900 BC until about 1300 BC. It is regarded as a regional form of the late phase of the Harappan (Indus Valley) civilisation (alongside the Jhukar culture of Sindh and Rangpur culture of Gujarat), but also as the manifestation of a first wave of Indo-Aryan migrations, predating the migrations of the proto-Rig Vedic people.

Origins
The Cemetery H culture was located in and around the Punjab region in present-day India and Pakistan. It was named after a cemetery found in "area H" at Harappa. Remains of the culture have been dated from about 1900 BC until about 1300 BC.

According to Rafique Mughal, the Cemetery H culture developed out of the northern part of the Indus Valley civilization around 1700 BC, being part of the Punjab Phase, one of three cultural phases that developed in the Localization Era or "Late Harappan phase" of the Indus Valley Tradition. According to Kenoyer, the Cemetery H culture "may only reflect a change in the focus of settlement organization from that which was the pattern of the earlier Harappan phase and not cultural discontinuity, urban decay, invading aliens, or site abandonment, all of which have been suggested in the past." According to Kennedy and Mallory & Adams, the Cemetery H culture also "shows clear biological affinities" with the earlier population of Harappa.

Some traits of the Cemetery H culture have been associated with the Swat culture, which has been regarded as evidence of the Indo-Aryan movement toward the Indian subcontinent. According to Parpola, the Cemetery H culture represents a first wave of Indo-Aryan migration from as early as 1900 BC, which was followed by a migration to the Punjab c. 1700-1400 BC. According to Kochhar, the Swat IV co-founded the Harappan Cemetery H phase in Punjab (2000-1800 BC), while the Rigvedic Indo-Aryans of Swat V later absorbed the Cemetery H people and gave rise to the Painted Grey Ware culture (to 1400 BC).

Together with the Gandhara grave culture and the Ochre Coloured Pottery culture, the Cemetery H culture is considered by some scholars as a factor in the formation of the Vedic civilization.

Features
The distinguishing features of this culture include:
 The use of cremation of human remains. The bones were stored in painted pottery burial urns. This is completely different from the Indus civilization where bodies were buried in wooden coffins. The urn burials and the "grave skeletons" were nearly contemporaneous.
 Reddish pottery, painted in black with antelopes, peacocks etc., sun or star motifs, with different surface treatments to the earlier period.
 Expansion of settlements into the east.
 Rice became a main crop.
 Apparent breakdown of the widespread trade of the Indus civilization, with materials such as marine shells no longer used.
 Continued use of mud brick for building.

Some of the designs painted on the Cemetery H funerary urns have been interpreted through the lens of Vedic mythology: for instance, peacocks with hollow bodies and a small human form inside, which has been interpreted as the souls of the dead, and a hound that can be seen as the hound of Yama, the god of death. This may indicate the introduction of new religious beliefs during this period, but the archaeological evidence does not support the hypothesis that the Cemetery H people were the destroyers of the Harappan cities.

Archaeology
Cremation in South Asia is first attested in the Cemetery H culture, a practice previously described in the Vedas. The Rigveda contains a reference to the emerging practice, in RV 10.15.14, where the forefathers "both cremated (agnidagdhá-) and uncremated (ánagnidagdha-)" are invoked.

See also

 Chronological dating
 Phases in archaeology
 Pottery in the Indian subcontinent
 Periodisation of the Indus Valley civilisation
 Ahar-Banas culture (3000 – 1500 BCE)
 Late Harappan Phase of IVC (1900 - 1500 BCE)
 Cemetery H culture in Punjab
 Jhukar-Jhangar culture in Punjab
 Rangpur culture in Gujarat
 Vedic period
 Kuru Kingdom (1200 – c. 500 BCE)
 OCP (2000-1500 BCE) 
 Copper Hoard culture (2800-1500 BCE), may or may not be independent of vedic culture

References

Sources

External links
 http://www.harappa.com harappa.com
 https://web.archive.org/web/20060908052731/http://pubweb.cc.u-tokai.ac.jp/indus/english/3_1_01.html journal

Archaeological cultures of South Asia
Bronze Age cultures of Asia
Archaeological cultures in Pakistan
Prehistoric India
History of Punjab
Indus Valley civilisation
Indus
Archaeological sites in Punjab, India
Archaeological cultures in India
Indo-Aryan archaeological cultures